Yuehua Entertainment (Chinese: 乐华娱乐, Korean: 위에화 엔터테인먼트) is a privately held Chinese multinational entertainment group and talent agency based in Beijing. The company was founded in June 2009 by former Huayi Brothers employee Du Hua. Yuehua is involved in television production and distribution, movie production, artist management and training, music and music video production, public relations, and entertainment marketing. Yuehua Entertainment had partnerships with the South Korean companies Pledis Entertainment, Starship Entertainment, and SM Entertainment.

Yuehua Entertainment received series-B financing from Gravity Media and CMC Capital in August 2014. CMC Capital invested US$49 million into the group and became its strategic shareholder at the completion of financing. In 2014 Yuehua Entertainment established a Korean branch located in Gangnam-gu, Seoul, South Korea. Yuehua announced plans for further expansion of their Korean branch operations beginning in February 2016.  In 2019, Yuehua Entertainment's Korean branch moved to a new building.

China

Groups 
Uniq
Next
YHBOYS
A-SOUL (VTuber group)
NAME
BOYHOOD

Soloists 
Han Geng (2010)
Zhang Yao (2012)
Zhou Yixuan (Uniq)
Li Wenhan (Uniq)
Wang Yibo (Uniq)
Ivy (2015)
Cheng Xiao 
Wu Xuanyi 
Meng Meiqi 
Zhu Zhengting (Next)
Bi Wenjun (Next)
Huang Xin Chun (Next)
Fan Chengcheng (Next)
Justin Huang (Next)
Wang Yiren (Everglow)
Elvis Wang 
Hu Chunyang 
Chen Xinwei 
Jin Zi Han (NAME)
Tang Jiu Zhou

Actors/Actresses 
Han Geng 
Ao Quan 
Wang Yibo 
Li Wenhan
Zhang Junyi
Liu Guanyi
Fan Chengcheng
Zhu Zhengting
Zhou Yixuan
Bi Wenjun
Wu Xuanyi
Xu Ya Ting 
Meng Meiqi 
Cheng Xiao
Hu Chunyang
Zhang Zi Jian
Chen Xinwei
Zhang Hao Lian
Zhang Jing Yun

Drama/Film Directors 
Jang Tae-yoo (Chinese market only)

Notable Trainees 
 Yang Zi Ge (Former Girls Planet 999 contestant)
 Zhou Xin Yu (Former Girls Planet 999 contestant)
 Xu Ruo Wei (Former Girls Planet 999 contestant)
 Liu Qi (Former Youth with You 3 contestant)
 Cheng Chen
 Zhang Hao (Boys Planet contestant)
 Brian (Boys Planet contestant)
 Ricky (Boys Planet contestant)
 Ollie (Boys Planet contestant)

South Korea 
Groups
Uniq
Hyeongseop X Euiwoong
Everglow
Tempest

Soloists
Choi Ye-na

Actors
Lee Do-hyun
Kim Sung-joo (Uniq)
Hwang Hyun-joo

Model
Hwang Hyun-joo

Notable trainees
Kim Gyu-vin (Boys Planet contestant)
Han Yu-jin (Boys Planet contestant)
Yoo Seung-eon (Boys Planet contestant)
Ji Yun-seo (Boys Planet contestant)

Former artists

 Uniq
 Cho Seung-youn (2014–2022)
 WJSN (2016–2023)

References

External links
 

 
Chinese record labels
Talent agencies of mainland China
Talent agencies of South Korea
Chinese companies established in 2009
2009 establishments in China
Companies based in Beijing
Talent agencies of China